The Haskell-Long House is a historic house located at 3858 Main Street in Middleburg, Florida.

Description and history 
It was added to the National Register of Historic Places on March 9, 1990.

References

External links
 Clay County listings at National Register of Historic Places
 Clay County listings at Florida's Office of Cultural and Historical Programs

National Register of Historic Places in Clay County, Florida
Houses on the National Register of Historic Places in Florida
Houses in Clay County, Florida
Vernacular architecture in Florida